Count Sebastian Lubomirski (c. 1546–1613) was a Polish–Lithuanian nobleman (szlachcic).

He was owner of Wiśnicz and Siercza. He was Żupnik of Kraków in 1581–1592, burgrave of Kraków since 1584, castellan of Małogoszcz since 1591, Biecz since 1598, Wojnicz since 1603 and starost of Sandomierz, Sącz and of Spisz.

Lubomirski had two consorts, Anna Branicka and Anna Pieniążek. He had six children with Branicka: Stanisław Lubomirski, Joachim Lubomirski, Katarzyna Lubomirska, Zofia Lubomirska, Barbara Lubomirska and Krystyna Lubomirska.

Secular senators of the Polish–Lithuanian Commonwealth
1540s births
1613 deaths
Sebastian
16th-century landowners
17th-century Polish landowners